Shahrikand (also Romanized as Shahrīkand and Shahrī Kand) is a village in Il Teymur Rural District of the Central District of Bukan County, West Azerbaijan province, Iran. At the 2006 National Census, its population was 694 in 117 households. The following census in 2011 counted 747 people in 165 households. The latest census in 2016 showed a population of 705 people in 211 households; it was the largest village in its rural district.

References 

Bukan County

Populated places in West Azerbaijan Province

Populated places in Bukan County